Heppner is a surname.

Notable surnames 
 Ben Heppner (born 1956), tenor
 Ben Heppner (politician) (1943–2006), politician
 Jens Heppner (born 1964), bicycle racer
 Kris Heppner (born 1977), footballer
 Mikey Heppner, guitarist
 Nancy Heppner (born 1971), politician
 Peter Heppner (born 1967), singer

Fictional characters 
 Timothy Heppner, fictional character in Andrew Unger's novel Once Removed

See also
 Hepner

Russian Mennonite surnames